Motyri is a rural locality (a village) in Sukhonskoye Rural Settlement, Mezhdurechensky District, Vologda Oblast, Russia. The population was 14 as of 2002. There are 2 streets.

Geography 
Motyri is located 30 km northeast of Shuyskoye (the district's administrative centre) by road. Znamenskoye is the nearest rural locality.

References 

Rural localities in Mezhdurechensky District, Vologda Oblast